R-469A is the name given to a refrigerant mixture. It is made up of 35% carbon dioxide (R-744), 32,5 % Difluoromethane (R-32) und 32,5 % Pentafluoroethane (R-125).

History 
The mixture was developed by TU Dresden and Weiss Technik (a member of the Schunk Group of companies). Starting point for the development was the restriction in use of the refrigerant Fluoroform (R-23) by EU regulation 517/2014  on fluorinated greenhouse gases. At this time, R-23 was the refrigerant used most often to achieve temperatures of up to –70 °C. Since 2014 R-23 has only been allowed to be used in new refrigerating equipment and devices within the context of transitional regulations.
This has led to a significant shortage of the quantity available, among other things, and an enormous increase in price.

The aim of the project was to develop a new refrigerant for temperatures down to –70 °C which fulfils the requirements of the EU regulation and is not combustible or toxic. In 2019 the mixture was registered with ASHRAE for the assignment of an R-number, which was allocated in the same year.

Properties 

R-469A is a chemically stable, transparent and odourless gas mixture. Since it is non-toxic and non-combustible, it has been graded in safety group A1. The global warming potential (GWP) ) of R-469A is 1357 and thus less than 10% of the value for R-23 (GWP 14800). Thanks to the low GWP value it fulfils the requirements of EU regulation 517/2014 on refrigerants for new systems even without the certificate of exemption otherwise necessary. Systems using the refrigerant R-469A up to 3.6 kg filling quantity are exempt from the Leak test in accordance with EU regulation 517/2014.

Use 
R-469A is used in test chambers for climate simulation which reach low temperatures of up to –70 °C. It is used as a substitute for R-23. The properties of R-469A with a view to cooling rate, thermal compensation or air distribution are almost identical to those of R-23. This makes the test results of systems using the two refrigerants directly comparable.

Trade names 
 WT69

Individual references 

Refrigerants